Town Hall railway station (originally known by the working title of CBD South) is a railway station currently under construction as part of the Metro Tunnel project. It is being built below Swanston Street between Flinders and Collins Streets.

Design
Initially it was planned to build the station using the cut-and-cover method, however this was changed so that the tunnels would run deeper underneath the ground in order to not disturb services, utilities and businesses on Swanston Street. Construction commenced in 2018 with the station expected to open in 2025.

The station is planned to have direct underground access to nearby Flinders Street station through the already existing Campbell Arcade connection.

Town Hall Station Precinct
As part of the construction of Town Hall Station, the City Square precinct is set to be rebuilt as a public gatherings and events space. There will be 70 new bike parking spaces built to cope with increasing demand, as well as improved tram interchanges on Flinders, Collins, and Swanston streets.

Services
Platform 1:
  All stations and limited express services to Sunbury from 2025 

Platform 2:
  Express services to Pakenham and Cranbourne

References

External links

Buildings and structures in Melbourne City Centre
Collins Street, Melbourne
Proposed railway stations in Melbourne
Railway stations in the City of Melbourne (LGA)
Railway stations located underground in Melbourne
Railway stations scheduled to open in 2025